Baseball America is a sports enterprise that covers baseball at every level, including MLB, with a particular focus on up-and-coming players in the MiLB, college, high school, and international leagues. It is currently published in the form of an editorial and stats website, a monthly magazine,  a podcast network, and three annual reference book titles. It also regularly produces lists of the top prospects in the sport, and covers aspects of the game from a scouting and player-development point of view. Industry insiders look to BA for its expertise and insights related to annual and future MLB Drafts classes.  The publication's motto is "The most trusted source in baseball."

History
Baseball America was founded in 1981 and has since grown into a full-service media company. Founder Allan Simpson began writing the magazine from Canada, originally calling it the All-America Baseball News. By 1983, Simpson moved the magazine to Durham, North Carolina, after it was purchased by then-Durham Bulls owner Miles Wolff. Simpson left his position at the magazine in 2006.

Source Interlink (later  and the Motor Trend Group) purchased Baseball America in December 2011 and sold the publication in February 2017. The new Baseball America Enterprises includes Gary Green and Larry Botel of Alliance Baseball, owners of minor league franchises in Omaha, Neb., and Richmond, Va., in partnership with David Geaslen, founder and CEO of 3STEP Sports. Today, Baseball America is led by president Tom Dondero and Editor in Chief J.J. Cooper. It also uses outsourced correspondents.

Content
Baseball America is published on the web and monthly in print. Every issue features coverage of the majors, minors, baseball's draft, college and high school baseball. Other features include reviews and analysis of prospects as well as tracking the progress of the best players in amateur baseball and the minors.

Other annual publications produced by the company include Baseball America Almanac, Baseball America Prospect Handbook (a New York Times sports best-seller in March 2016), and the Baseball America Directory. Baseball America also has an active social media presence on Facebook, Twitter, YouTube and Instagram, bringing its scouting and player-development point of view to 21st century media platforms.

All-Star Futures Game

Baseball America helps MLB select the players for the All-Star Futures Game.

Major League Baseball awards

Awards include:

Baseball America Major League Player of the Year

Baseball America Rookie of the Year

Baseball America All-Rookie Team
Note: Each year's team consists of a varying number of pitchers and types of pitchers.
 2007
 2008
 2009 (a catcher, 4 infielders, 3 outfielders, one DH, and 5 pitchers)
 2010 (a catcher, 4 infielders, 3 outfielders, one DH, 5 starting pitchers, 2 relief pitchers, and one closer)
 2011 (a catcher, 4 infielders, 3 outfielders, one DH, 5 starting pitchers, 2 relief pitchers, and one closer)

Baseball America Manager of the Year

 – Larry Dierker, Houston
 – Jimy Williams, Boston
 – Dusty Baker, San Francisco
 – Lou Piniella, Seattle
 – Mike Scioscia, Los Angeles Angels
 – Jack McKeon, Florida
 – Bobby Cox, Atlanta
 – Ozzie Guillén, Chicago White Sox
 – Jim Leyland, Detroit
 – Terry Francona, Boston
 – Ron Gardenhire, Minnesota
 – Mike Scioscia, Los Angeles Angels
 – Bobby Cox, Atlanta
 – Joe Maddon, Tampa Bay
 – Buck Showalter, Baltimore
 – Clint Hurdle, Pittsburgh
 – Buck Showalter, Baltimore
 – Joe Maddon, Chicago Cubs
 – Terry Francona, Cleveland
 - A. J. Hinch, Houston

Baseball America Major League Coach of the Year
See footnote

Baseball America Major League Executive of the Year

  – Dave Dombrowski, Detroit Tigers
  – Jack Zduriencik, Milwaukee Brewers
  – Theo Epstein, Boston Red Sox
  – Dan O'Dowd, Colorado Rockies
  – Jon Daniels, Texas Rangers
  – Doug Melvin, Milwaukee Brewers
  – Brian Sabean, San Francisco Giants
  – Billy Beane, Oakland Athletics
  – Dan Duquette, Baltimore Orioles
  – Sandy Alderson, New York Mets
  – Chris Antonetti, Cleveland Indians
  – Brian Cashman, New York Yankees
  – Dave Dombrowski, Boston Red Sox
  – Mike Rizzo, Washington Nationals
  – Andrew Friedman, Los Angeles Dodgers
  – Farhan Zaidi, San Francisco Giants

Source

Baseball America Roland Hemond Award
See footnote

Baseball America Lifetime Achievement Award
See footnote

Baseball America Organization of the Year
The "Organization of the Year" award was first presented in 1982.

 – Oakland Athletics
 – New York Mets
 – New York Mets
 – Milwaukee Brewers
 – Milwaukee Brewers
 – Milwaukee Brewers
 – Montreal Expos
 – Texas Rangers
 – Montreal Expos
 – Atlanta Braves
 – Cleveland Indians
 – Toronto Blue Jays
 – Kansas City Royals
 – New York Mets
 – Atlanta Braves
 – Detroit Tigers
 – New York Yankees
 – Oakland Athletics
 – Chicago White Sox
 – Houston Astros
 – Minnesota Twins
 – Florida Marlins
 – Minnesota Twins
 – Atlanta Braves
 – Los Angeles Dodgers
 – Colorado Rockies
 – Tampa Bay Rays
 – Philadelphia Phillies
 – San Francisco Giants
 – St. Louis Cardinals
 – Cincinnati Reds
 – St. Louis Cardinals
 – Kansas City Royals
 – Pittsburgh Pirates
 – Chicago Cubs
 – Los Angeles Dodgers
 - Milwaukee Brewers
 - Tampa Bay Rays
 - Los Angeles Dodgers

Minor League Baseball awards
See footnote

 Baseball America Minor League Player of the Year Award
 Baseball America Independent Leagues Player of the Year
 Baseball America Minor League All-Star Team (First team and Second team)
Baseball America Triple-A Classification All-Star Team
Baseball America Double-A Classification All-Star Team
Baseball America High Class A Classification All-Star Team
Baseball America Low Class A Classification All-Star Team
Baseball America Rookie-Level Classification All-Star Team
Baseball America Dominican Summer League Classification All-Star Team
Baseball America Short-Season Classification All-Star Team
 Baseball America Minor League Manager of the Year
 Baseball America Minor League Team of the Year
 Baseball America Minor League Executive of the Year
 Baseball America Bob Freitas Awards (for outstanding minor-league operations at Triple-A, Double-A, Class A, and short-season) (first awarded in 1989)
 Baseball America Independent Organization of the Year (first awarded in 2006)

College baseball awards
See footnote

In addition to the awards below, Baseball America releases rankings of the top 25 teams in the nation, as voted by its staff.  A preseason poll is compiled, in addition to a weekly poll during the season.
Baseball America College Player of the Year Award
Baseball America All-America Teams
Baseball America Freshman of The Year
Baseball America Freshman All-America Team
Baseball America Summer College Player of the Year
Baseball America College Coach of the Year
Baseball America Assistant Coach of the Year

High school baseball awards
See footnote

Baseball America High School Player of the Year Award
Baseball America High School Team of the Year
Baseball America High School All-America Teams
Baseball America Youth Player of the Year
Baseball America Youth Coach of the Year

Best baseball books

2010 – The Last Boy: Mickey Mantle and the End of America's Childhood; by Jane Leavy (HarperCollins)

See also

List of MLB awards

Footnotes

External links
Baseball America official website
Baseball America Awards home page. Baseball America website
Majors home page. Baseball America website
Minors home page. Baseball America website
College home page. Baseball America website
High school home page. Baseball America website
Prospects home page. Baseball America website
Draft home page. Baseball America website
Baseball America sale announcement
Stats and Scores home page (by player, franchise, or league). Baseball America website
MLB: American League Stats webpage. Sports Illustrated (CNN)

1980 establishments in North Carolina
Biweekly magazines published in the United States
Sports magazines published in the United States
America
Baseball websites
Magazines established in 1981
Magazines published in North Carolina
Mass media in Durham, North Carolina